Olle Gewalt (1 February 1921 – 1985) was a Swedish curler.

He was a 1966 Swedish men's curling champion.

He was employed as a construction engineer.

Teams

References

External links
 

1921 births
1985 deaths
Sportspeople from Stockholm
Swedish male curlers
Swedish curling champions